Kieron Purtill was most recently the head coach of the Widnes Vikings in the Betfred Championship before resigning in October 2019 after signing a 1 year contract extension only two months prior. He is the former head coach of both the Canada national rugby league team and the England Knights/Elite Development Squad.

Background
Purtill was born in Wigan, Greater Manchester, England.

Playing career
A former scrum half for the Wigan Warriors, Huddersfield Giants and Leigh Centurions, Purtill was forced to retire from playing due to injury and moved into coaching.

Coaching career
He started as a coach at St. Helens before joining Huddersfield Giants as an assistant coach in 2005. At Huddersfield, he worked under head coach Jon Sharp, who rated him as one of the best young coaches in the game. Following Sharp's departure from the club in 2008, Purtill had a brief spell as caretaker coach alongside Paul Anderson. He then moved to St Helens where he worked under Michael Potter and then Royce Simmons. He also became head coach of the Canada Wolverines rugby league team and in 2011 the England Knights team. He also did a PG Dip in Elite Coaching Practice at the University of Central Lancashire. He parted company with St Helens along with Royce Simmons on 18 March 2012 following a run of 5 games without a win. He has since been linked with a return to Huddersfield or to Bradford Bulls, both in assistant roles.

References

External links

Leigh Centurions profile

1977 births
Living people
Canada national rugby league team coaches
England Knights national rugby league team coaches
English rugby league coaches
English rugby league players
Huddersfield Giants coaches
Huddersfield Giants players
Leigh Leopards captains
Leigh Leopards coaches
Leigh Leopards players
Rugby league centres
Rugby league halfbacks
Rugby league players from Wigan
Widnes Vikings coaches